Rumah Nyumbang (also known as Rumah Peng Ngumbang) is a settlement in the Kanowit division of Sarawak, Malaysia.

Neighbouring settlements include:

References

Populated places in Sarawak